Orthida is an extinct order of brachiopods which appeared during the Early Cambrian period and became very diverse by the Ordovician, living in shallow-shelf seas.  Orthids are the oldest member of the subphylum Rhynchonelliformea, and is the order from which all other brachiopods of this group stem.  Physically they are usually strophic, with well-developed interareas.  They also commonly have radiating ribs, sulcus, and fold structures.  Typically one valve, often the brachial valve, is flatter than the other.  The interior structure of the brachial valves are usually simple.  In shape they are sub-circular to elliptical, with typically biconvex valves.

There is some debate over the forms that first appeared of this order as to how they should be classified.  However, they began to differentiate themselves by the late Early Cambrian period, and by the late Cambrian period had diversified into numerous varieties and reach 2 to 5 cm in width.  Specimens from the late Cambrian to the earliest Ordovician exhibit shells with rounded and pointed pedicle valves, with sharp to obtuse extremities and ridges that are fine to course.  Punctate shells appear during the mid-Ordovician, which establish the suborder Dalmanellidina.  The Ordovician is a productive period which gives rise to numerous genera in this order. However, they started to become greatly reduced by the end of the Ordovician extinction event.  Both the impunctate and punctate survived through to the early Devonian  Eventually, though, only the punctate lived on, and would play a minor role in benthic ecosystems until the late Permian, when they became extinct.

Taxonomy 
The taxonomy taken from the 2000 treatise is as follows:

Suborder Orthidina 
 Superfamily Orthoidea
 Family Orthidae
 Family Anomalorthidae
 Family Bohemiellidae
 Family Glyptorthidae
 Family Hesperonomiidae
 Family Hesperorthidae
 Family Lycophoriidae
 Family Nanorthidae
 Family Orthidiellidae
 Family Plaesiomyidae
 Family Poramborthidae
 Family Productorthidae
 Family Whittardiidae
 Superfamily Plectorthoidea
 Family Plectorthidae
 Family Cremnorthidae
 Family Cyclocoeliidae
 Family Eoorthidae
 Family Euorthisinidae
 Family Finkelnburgiidae
 Family Giraldiellidae
 Family Phragmorthidae
 Family Platystrophiidae
 Family Ranorthidae
 Family Rhactorthidae
 Family Tasmanorthidae
 Family Wangyuiidae

Suborder Dalmanellidina
 Superfamily Dalmanelloidea
 Family Dalmanellidae
 Family Angusticardiniidae
 Family Dicoelosiidae
 Family Harknessellidae
 Family Heterorthidae
 Family Hypsomyoniidae
 Family Kayserellidae
 Family Mystrophoridae
 Family Paurorthidae
 Family Platyorthidae
 Family Portranellidae
 Family Proschizophoriidae
 Family Rhipidomellidae
 Family Tyronellidae
 Superfamily Enteletoidea
 Family Enteletidae
 Family Draboviidae
 Family Chrustenoporidae
 Family Linoporellidae
 Family Saukrodictyidae
 Family Schizophoriidae

Notes

Prehistoric brachiopods
Prehistoric animal orders
Brachiopod orders
Rhynchonellata